WQSS (102.5 FM, "Kiss FM") is a radio station licensed to Camden, Maine with studios in Augusta, Maine. The station, owned by Blueberry Broadcasting, broadcasts an adult contemporary format simulcast with WKSQ (94.5 FM) in Ellsworth and WQSK (97.5 FM) in Madison.

History
WQSS began broadcasting in May 1988. The first song played was "Here Comes The Sun" by the Beatles. For many years, WQSS was known as "Coast 102.5" and had an adult contemporary format, with studios located in Camden. Until December 26, 2008, the station was known as "102-5 The Peak" playing a classic hits format. WQSS then changed back to adult contemporary, as "Midcoast 102.5." On February 24, 2014, the station began to simulcast with WKSQ and WQSK as "Kiss FM".

Former logo

References

External links

QSS
Mainstream adult contemporary radio stations in the United States
Camden, Maine
Radio stations established in 1988
1988 establishments in Maine
Blueberry Broadcasting radio stations